Patch collecting or badge collecting (also, scutelliphily, from Latin scutellus meaning little shield, and Greek phileein meaning to love) is the hobby of collecting patches or badges.

Souvenir patches
Souvenir patches are usually shield-shaped and generally contain a coat of arms, a map or a miniature view. The patches can be made of any material, but are usually woven or embroidered fabric, though they can also be made from paper or, increasingly, plastic.

Other types of collectible patches include police or service patches, space mission patches, Scout patches, fashion patches, political and sports stickers, walking stick labels, car window pennants, and pin badges. Collecting metal badges or pins, either military or civil is known as faleristics.

History
Badges have been collected since ancient times. Greek and Roman pilgrims to pagan shrines made collections of miniature images of gods and goddesses or their emblems, and Christian pilgrims later did the same. Usually medieval Christian pilgrim badges were metal pin badges - most famously the shell symbol showing the wearer had been to the shrine of St. James at Santiago de Compostela in Spain. These were stuck in hats or into clothing and hardworking pilgrims could assemble quite a collection, as mentioned by Chaucer in his 'Canterbury Tales'.

The growth in the 19th century of travel for ordinary people saw a huge increase in the souvenir industry, as these new secular pilgrims - like their medieval counterparts - wanted to bring back reminders of their holidays/vacations and sightseeing, ranging from china plates to postcards.

The production of stick-on souvenir badges seems to have started in mainland Europe during the early 20th-century, probably in Germany shortly after the First World War when hiking became popular, and people began sewing badges of resort towns onto their backpacks and jackets. In the U.S., the development of the National parks system and the growing popularity of vacationing saw a similar development of patch collecting.

After the Second World War, American GIs occupying Germany sent badges back to their loved ones, showing where they were stationed. These badges became known as sweetheart patches. They were also imported to Britain by Sampson Souvenirs Ltd., which also began producing badges of British tourist spots, and went on to become (and still is) the largest British manufacturer of souvenir badges. The biggest American manufacturer is Voyager Emblems of Sanborn, New York.

Law enforcement patch collecting
See Police patch collecting

Another patch collecting specialty is police agencies such as sheriff, police, highway patrol, marshal, constable, park rangers, law enforcement explorer scouts, or other law enforcement related personnel. Emblems worn on uniforms have been exchanged between officials as a sign of cooperation for decades, and displays of patches are found in police stations. The publishing of reference books on law enforcement insignia over the past decade has made law enforcement patch collecting a popular way to preserve law enforcement history.

Fire department patch collecting

Similar to police patches, fire department patches are also traded amongst fire agencies and some are sold to the general public. Station patches are available amongst large fire departments in North America. Some station patches are worn by firefighters, but mostly not on official uniforms. The patch design is sometimes found on fire vehicles.

See also
Flag patch
Militaria
Military badges of the United States
Scouting memorabilia collecting
Police patch collecting

External links
 PatchGallery.com

References

Collecting